The Hôtel Continental is the former name of a hotel in Paris, France, now known as The Westin Paris – Vendôme.

Hotel Continental may also refer to:

 Hotel Continental, Hanko, Finland, now the Hotel Regatta
 Hotel Continental, Ho Chi Minh City, Vietnam
 Hotel Continental, Oslo, Norway
 Hotel Continental Sibiu, Romania
 Hotel Continental (Tangier), Morocco
 Hotel Continental (film), a 1932 American film

See also
 Continental Hotels, Romanian hotel chain
 IHG Hotels & Resorts (InterContinental Hotels Group), British hotel chain
 InterContinental, Pan-Am subsidiary U.S. hotel chain
 Hotel Inter-Continental Kabul, Afghanistan, unaffiliated with the U.S. hotel chain
 The Continental (disambiguation)
 Continental (disambiguation)
 Hotel (disambiguation)